Beaumont Bay is an ice-filled reentrant on the west side of the Ross Ice Shelf between Young Head and Harris Point, into which Dickey Glacier flows. It was discovered by the British National Antarctic Expedition (1901–04) and named for Admiral Sir Lewis Beaumont, Royal Navy, an Arctic explorer who took a special interest in this expedition.

See also
 Howard-Williams Point

References
 

Bays of the Ross Dependency
Shackleton Coast